The American Academy of Arts and Letters is a 300-member honor society whose goal is to "foster, assist, and sustain excellence" in American literature, music, and art. Its fixed number membership is elected for lifetime appointments. Its headquarters is in the Washington Heights neighborhood of Manhattan in New York City. It shares Audubon Terrace, a Beaux Arts/American Renaissance complex on Broadway between West 155th and 156th Streets, with the Hispanic Society of America and Boricua College.

The academy's galleries are open to the public on a published schedule. Exhibits include an annual exhibition of paintings, sculptures, photographs and works on paper by contemporary artists nominated by its members, and an annual exhibition of works by newly elected members and recipients of honors and awards. A permanent exhibit of the recreated studio of composer Charles Ives was opened in 2014.

The auditorium is sought out by musicians and engineers wishing to record live, as the acoustics are considered among the city's finest. Hundreds of commercial recordings have been made there.

History

Early years 
The American Academy and Institute of Arts and Letters was formed from three parent organizations. The first, the American Social Science Association, was founded in 1865, at Boston. The second was the National Institute of Arts and Letters, which ASSA's membership created in 1898. The qualification for membership in the NIAL was notable achievement in art, music, or literature. The NIAL's membership was at first limited to 150 (all men). The third organization was the American Academy of Arts, which NIAL's membership created in 1904, as a preeminent national arts institution, styling itself after the French Academy.

The AAA's first seven academicians were elected from ballots cast by the NIAL membership. They were William Dean Howells, Samuel L. Clemens, Edmund Clarence Stedman, and John Hay, representing literature; Augustus Saint-Gaudens and John La Farge, representing art; and Edward MacDowell, representing music. The NIAL membership increased in 1904, with the introduction of a two-tiered structure: 50 academicians and 200 regular members. Academicians were gradually elected over the next several years. The elite group (academicians) were called the "Academy," and the larger group (regular members) was called the "Institute." This strict two-tiered system persisted for 72 years (1904–76).

In 1908, poet Julia Ward Howe was elected to the AAA, becoming the first female academician.

In 1976, the NIAL and AAA merged, under the name American Academy and Institute of Arts and Letters. The combined Academy/Institute structure had a maximum of 250 living U.S. citizens as members, plus up to 75 foreign composers, artists, and writers as honorary members. It also established the annual Witter Bynner Poetry Prize in 1980 to support young poets. The election of foreign honorary members persisted until 1993, when it was abandoned.

Federally chartered corporation 
The Academy holds a Congressional charter under Title 36 of the United States Code (42 USC 20301 et seq.), making it one of the country's comparatively rare "Title 36" corporations. The 1916 statute of incorporation established this institution among a small number of other similarly chartered patriotic and national organizations. The federal incorporation was originally construed primarily as an honor. The special recognition neither implies nor accords Congress any special control over the Academy, which functions independently.

Active sponsors of Congressional action were Senator Henry Cabot Lodge of Massachusetts and former President Theodore Roosevelt. The process that led to the creation of this federal charter was controversial and the first attempt to gain the charter in 1910 failed. Lodge reintroduced legislation, which passed the Senate in 1913. The Academy was incorporated under the laws of the State of New York in 1914, which resulted in Congressional approval in 1916.

Buildings 

The Academy occupies three buildings on the west end of the Audubon Terrace complex created by Archer M. Huntington, the heir to the Southern Pacific Railroad fortune and a noted philanthropist. To help convince the American Academy of Arts and Letters and the National Institute of Arts and Letters, which were separate but related organizations at the time, to move to the complex, Huntington established building funds and endowments for both.

The first building, on the complex's south side, along West 155th Street, was designed by William M. Kendall of McKim, Mead & White; Kendall was also a member of the Academy. This Anglo-Italian Renaissance administration building was designed in 1921 and opened in 1923. On the north side, another building housing an auditorium and gallery was designed by Cass Gilbert, also an Academy member, and built in 1928-30. These additions to the complex necessitated considerable alterations to the Audubon Terrace plaza, which were designed by McKim, Mead & White.

In 2007, the American Numismatic Society, which had occupied a Charles P. Huntington-designed building immediately to the east of the Academy's original building, vacated that space to move to smaller quarters downtown. This building, which incorporates a 1929 addition designed by H. Brooks Price, became the Academy's Annex and houses additional gallery space. In 2009, the space between the Annex and the administration building was turned into a new entrance link, designed by Vincent Czajka with Pei Cobb Freed & Partners.

Membership 
Members of the Academy are chosen for life and have included some of the American art scene's leading figures. They are organized into committees that award annual prizes to up-and-coming artists. Although the names of some of the organization's members may not be well-known today, each was well-known in their time. Greatness and pettiness are demonstrable among the Academy members, even during the first decade, when William James declined his nomination on the grounds that his little brother Henry had been elected first. One of the giants of the academy in his time, Robert Underwood Johnson, casts a decades-long shadow in his one-man war against encroaching modernism, blackballing such writers as H. L. Mencken, F. Scott Fitzgerald, and T. S. Eliot (before his emigration to England disqualified him for full membership). Former Harvard president Charles William Eliot declined election to the Academy "because he was already in so many societies that he didn't want to add to the number".

Although never explicitly excluded, women were not elected to membership in the early years. The admission of Julia Ward Howe in January 1908 (at age 88) as the first woman in the Academy was only one incident in the intense debate about the consideration of female members. In 1926, the election of four women— Edith Wharton, Margaret Deland, Agnes Repplier and Mary Eleanor Wilkins Freeman—was said to have "marked the letting down of the bars to women".

Below is a partial list of past members of the American Academy of Arts and Letters and its successor institution, the National Institute and Academy of Arts and Letters:

 Henry Brooks Adams
 Herbert Adams
 Henry Mills Alden
 Nelson Algren
 Hannah Arendt
 Newton Arvin
 Wystan Hugh Auden
 Paul Wayland Bartlett
 Chester Beach
 Stephen Vincent Benét
 William Rose Benét
 Edwin Howland Blashfield
 William Brownell
 George de Forest Brush
 John Burroughs
 William S. Burroughs
 Nicholas Murray Butler
 George Washington Cable
 Hortense Calisher
 Joseph Campbell
 George Whitefield Chadwick
 William Merritt Chase
 Chou Wen-chung
 Timothy Cole
 Billy Collins 
 Kenyon Cox
 John Dos Passos
 Bob Dylan
 Thomas Harlan Ellett
 Stanley Elkin
 Duke Ellington
 Ralph Ellison
 Daniel Chester French
 William Gaddis
 Hamlin Garland
 Charles Dana Gibson
 Cass Gilbert
 Richard Watson Gilder
 Basil Lanneau Gildersleeve
 Brendan Gill
 William Gillette
 Daniel Coit Gilman
 Allen Ginsberg
 Bertram G. Goodhue
 Robert Grant
 William Elliot Griffis
 Arthur Twining Hadley
 Childe Hassam
 Thomas Hastings
 Anthony Hecht
 David Jayne Hill
 Ripley Hitchcock
 Cecil de Blaquiere Howard
 Julia Ward Howe
 William Henry Howe
 William Dean Howells
 Archer Milton Huntington
 Charles Ives
 Henry James
 Robert Underwood Johnson
 Louis I. Kahn
 Kenneth Koch
 Maxine Kumin
 Sinclair Lewis
 Roy Lichtenstein
 Henry Cabot Lodge
 Abbott Lawrence Lowell
 Mary McCarthy
 Hamilton Wright Mabie
 Archibald MacLeish
 Frederick William MacMonnies
 J. D. McClatchy
 Brander Matthews
 William Keepers Maxwell Jr.
 William Rutherford Mead
 Gari Melchers
Willard Metcalf
 Edna St. Vincent Millay
 Charles Moore
 Douglas Moore
 Paul Elmer More
 Robert Motherwell
 Georgia O'Keeffe
 Thomas N. Page
 Horatio Parker
 Joseph Pennell
 Bliss Perry
 William Lyon Phelps
 Charles Adams Platt
 Ezra Pound
 James Ford Rhodes
 James Whitcomb Riley
 George Lockhart Rives
 Elihu Root
 Theodore Roosevelt
 Mark Rothko
 Eero Saarinen
 Carl Sandburg
 John Singer Sargent
 Meyer Schapiro
 Arnold Schoenberg
 Harry Rowe Shelley
 Stuart Sherman
 Robert E. Sherwood
 Paul Shorey
 William Milligan Sloane
 Wallace Stevens
 Meryl Streep
 Lorado Taft
 Josef Tal
 Booth Tarkington
 Abbott Handerson Thayer
 William Roscoe Thayer
 Augustus Thomas
 Virgil Thomson
 Lionel Trilling
 Henry van Dyke
 John Charles Van Dyke
 Elihu Vedder
 Kurt Vonnegut
 Julian Alden Weir
 Barrett Wendell
 Edith Wharton
 Andrew Dickson White
 Thornton Wilder
 Brand Whitlock
 William Carlos Williams
 Woodrow Wilson
 Owen Wister
 George Edward Woodberry
 Frank Lloyd Wright
 James A. Wright

Current academicians

Awards

Award for Distinguished Service to the Arts 
The award, a certificate and $1,000, goes to a United States resident who has "rendered notable service to the arts".

 2003: Leon Botstein
 2008: Judith Jamison

Other awards 

The academy gives out numerous awards, with recipients chosen by committees of Academy members. Candidates for awards must be nominated by Academy members, except for the Richard Rodgers awards, for which an application may be submitted.
 Arts and Letters Award (formerly, the Academy Award of the American Academy of Arts and Letters): In 1941, the Academy established awards to encourage creative work in the arts. Now $10,000 each, Academy Awards are given annually: five to artists, eight to writers, four to composers, and three to architects.
 Marc Blitzstein Award: The $5,000 award is given periodically to a composer, lyricist, or librettist, "to encourage the creation of works of merit for musical theater and opera". The award was established in 1965 by the friends of Marc Blitzstein, an Academy member.
 Michael Braude Award for Light Verse: The $5,000 biennial award is given "for light verse written in English regardless of the country of origin of the writer".
 Arnold W. Brunner Memorial Prize: The annual prize of $5,000 goes to an architect of any nationality who has "made a contribution to architecture as an art".
 Benjamin H. Danks Award: The $20,000 award is given in rotation to a composer of ensemble works, a playwright, and a writer (fiction, nonfiction, poetry). Since 2002, the Academy has administered the prize established by Roy Lyndon Danks in honor of his father, Benjamin Hadley Danks.
 Jimmy Ernst Award: Established by Dallas Ernst in memory of her husband, the Jimmy Ernst Award of $5,000 is given to a painter or sculptor "whose lifetime contribution to his or her vision has been both consistent and dedicated". The award has been presented annually since 1990.
 E. M. Forster Award: E. M. Forster, a foreign honorary member of the Academy, bequeathed the U.S. royalties of his posthumous novel Maurice to Christopher Isherwood, who transferred them to the Academy to establish this $15,000 award. It is given to a young English writer for an extended visit to the United States.
 American Academy of Arts and Letters Gold Medals: Each year the Academy awards Gold Medals for distinguished achievement in two categories in rotation. The Gold Medal is given for the entire work of the recipient.
 Belles Lettres, Criticism, Essays and Painting;
 Biography and Music;
 Fiction and Sculpture;
 History and Architecture, including landscape architecture;
 Poetry and Music;
 Drama and Graphic Art.
 Walter Hinrichsen Award: The Walter Hinrichsen Award is given for the publication of "a work by a mid-career American composer".
 William Dean Howells Medal: This award is given every five years in recognition of the most distinguished American novel published during that period. It was established in 1925.
 The Charles Ives Prize: Six scholarships of $7,500 and two fellowships of $15,000 are now given annually to young composers. In 1998, the Academy established the Charles Ives Living, an award of $75,000 a year for a period of three years given to an American composer. The award's purpose is to free "a promising talent from the need to devote his or her time to any employment other than music composition" during that period.
 The Charles Ives Opera Prize: In 2008, the Academy awarded the inaugural Charles Ives Opera Prize of $50,000, to be given from time to time to a composer and a librettist for a recently produced opera. It is America’s largest vocal music award.
 Sue Kaufman Prize for First Fiction: The $5,000 prize is given for the best published first novel or collection of short stories in the preceding year.
 Wladimir and Rhoda Lakond Award: an annual award of $5,000 "given either to a composition student or an experienced composer".
 Goddard Lieberson Fellowships: Two Goddard Lieberson Fellowships of $15,000 are given annually to young composers of extraordinary gifts. The CBS Foundation endowed the fellowships in memory of Lieberson, the late president of CBS Records.
 Russell Loines Award for Poetry
 American Academy of Arts and Letters Award of Merit: The Award of Merit, a medal and $10,000, is given each year, in rotation, to an outstanding person in America representing painting, the short story, sculpture, the novel, poetry, and drama.
 Metcalf Awards: In 1986, the Academy received a bequest from Addison M. Metcalf, son of the late member Willard L. Metcalf, for two awards to honor young writers and artists of great promise. The Willard L. Metcalf Award in Art and the Addison M. Metcalf Award in Literature are biennial awards of $10,000.
 Katherine Anne Porter Award: This biennial award of $20,000 goes to a prose writer who has demonstrated achievements and dedication to the literary profession.
 Arthur Rense Prize: In 1998, this $20,000 award was established to honor "an exceptional poet" every third year.
 Richard Rodgers Awards for Musical Theater: These awards subsidize full productions, studio productions, and staged readings of musicals put on by nonprofit theaters in New York City. The plays are by composers and writers who are not already established. These are the only awards for which the Academy accepts applications.
 Rome Prize in Literature: Every year the Academy selects and partly subsidizes two young writers for a one-year residence at the American Academy in Rome.
 Richard and Hinda Rosenthal Foundation Awards: Each of these two awards are for $5,000. The first, established in 1956, is for a fiction work of "considerable literary achievement" published in the previous year. The second, created in 1959, is for a young painter "who has not yet been accorded due recognition".
 Medal for Spoken Language: This medal, awarded from time to time, recognizes individuals who set a standard of excellence in the use of spoken language.
 The Mildred and Harold Strauss Livings: These Livings provide an annual stipend of $50,000 a year for five years, awarded to two writers of English prose literature to enable them to devote their time exclusively to writing.
 Harold D. Vursell Memorial Award: This $10,000 award is given each year to honor a writer of "recent prose that merits recognition for the quality of its style".
 Morton Dauwen Zabel Award: This $10,000 biennial award is given in rotation to a poet, writer of fiction, or critic, "of progressive, original, and experimental tendencies".

References 
Notes

Sources
 Lewis, Richard W. B. (1998). "1898–1907: The Founder's Story," in A Century of Arts & Letters (John Updike, ed.). New York: Columbia University Press.  (cloth)

External links 

 American Academy of Arts & Letters — official website
 Cornell Legal Institute: Title 36 > Subtitle II > Part B > Chapter 203 > § 20301 et seq. — easiest to read
 United States House of Representatives: 36 USC Chapter 203
 United States Government Publishing Office (GPO): US Code, Title 36, Chapter 203 — revised §4701 et seq. (1916–1998)
 American Academy of Arts and Letters records, 1864–1942 from the Smithsonian Archives of American Art

 
Learned societies of the United States
American artist groups and collectives
American writers' organizations
Patriotic and national organizations chartered by the United States Congress
Society museums in New York (state)
Museums in Manhattan
Washington Heights, Manhattan
1904 establishments in New York City
Organizations established in 1904
Academies of arts